The State of Palestine compete as Palestine at the Paralympic Games. Their first participation came at the Sydney Paralympics in 2000, where Husam Azzam won bronze in the shot put event. Palestinian athletes have won three Paralympic medals to date: a silver and two bronze.

Medal tables

Medals by Summer Games

Medals by Summer sport

See also
 Palestine Olympic Committee
 Palestine at the Olympics

References